The Trentino-Alto Adige/Südtirol provincial elections of 2013 took place on 27 October 2013.

Trentino

Centre-left primary election
A primary election to determine the candidate for President of the centre-left autonomist coalition were held on 13 July 2013. The winner was Ugo Rossi of the Trentino Tyrolean Autonomist Party.

Parties and candidates

Results
In Trentino, where the President is elected directly by the people, Ugo Rossi (Trentino Tyrolean Autonomist Party, supported also by the Democratic Party, the Trentino Tyrolean Autonomist Party and other minor parties) was elected by a landslide (58.1%). Diego Mosna (Trentino Project) arrived a distant second with 19.3% of the vote, while Maurizio Fugatti (Northern League Trentino) came third with 6.6%.

The Democratic Party was confirmed as the largest party in the Province (22.1%), followed by the Trentino Tyrolean Autonomist Party (17.5%), Union for Trentino (13.3%), Trentino Project (9.0%), Lega Nord Trentino (6.2%) and the Five Star Movement (5.8%).

South Tyrol

SVP primary election
The South Tyrolean People's Party held a primary election on 21 April 2013 to select the party's head of the provincial list. Arno Kompatscher won by a landslide.

Results
In South Tyrol the South Tyrolean People's Party (SVP), lost the absolute majority it maintained for 65 years, but was confirmed by far as the largest party. Die Freiheitlichen (+3.6%), the Greens (+2.9%), South Tyrolean Freedom (+2.3%) and the Democratic Party (+0.7%) made gains, while the Italian centre-right, divided in four lists (FI-LN, AAC, Unitalia and La Destra), lost votes and seats. Only five of the elected councillors were Italian-speakers, a record low.

References

Elections in Trentino-Alto Adige/Südtirol
2013 elections in Italy
October 2013 events in Europe